Tertiary Education Trust Fund, abbreviated as TETFUND, is a scheme established by the Federal Government of Nigeria in 2011 to disburse, manage, and monitor education tax to government-owned tertiary institutions in Nigeria.

The TETFUND scheme was formed as a product of the Education Tax Act of 1993. This Act repeals the Education Tax Act Cap. E4, Laws of the Federation of Nigeria, 2004 and Education Tax Fund Act No. 17, 2003 and establishes the Tertiary Education Trust Fund charged with the responsibility for imposing, managing and disbursing the tax to public tertiary institutions in Nigeria. Before the establishment of the scheme in 2011, government-owned tertiary institutions were poorly funded. The scheme was designed to improve the management of funds disbursed to these institutions.

Background 
From the 1980s and beyond, the decay of all tiers of education was monumental. Facilities had almost collapsed, teachers and lecturers morale was at its lowest. Enabling environment for conducive teaching and learning was absent. The administration of President, Ibrahim Babangida mindful of the reality of the situation took measures to arrest the rot. In December 1990 the Federal Government constituted the Commission on the Review of Higher Education in Nigeria (the Gray Longe Commission)  to review the post-independence Nigerian Higher Education after Lord Ashby’s Commission of 1959.
The Longe Commission recommended among others the funding of higher education through earmarked tax to be borne by companies operating in Nigeria. An implementation committee under the chairmanship of Professor Olu O. Akinkugbe was constituted to implement Grey Longe’s Commission report recommendations also an Agreement was signed between the Federal Government and ASUU on the 3rd September 1992 on funding of universities. 
In January 1993, the Education Tax Act No7 of 1993 was promulgated alongside other education-related Decrees. The Decree imposed a 2% tax on the assessable profits of all companies in Nigeria. This was a homegrown solution to address issues of funding to rehabilitate decaying infrastructure, restore the lost glory of education and confidence in the system as well as consolidate the gains thereto;  build the capacity of teachers and lecturers; teacher development; development of prototype designs; etc.
The Education Tax Act of No7 of 1993 mandated the Fund to operate as an Intervention Fund to all levels of public education   ( Federal, State and Local). This mandate was faithfully discharged between 1999 to May 2011 when the ET Act was repealed and replaced by the Tertiary Education Trust Fund Act, due to lapses and challenges in operating the Education Trust Fund.
These lapses and challenges include:
 The ETF was overburdened and overstretched and could only render palliative support to all levels of public educational institutions in Nigeria;
 Duplication of functions and mandate of other Agencies set up after the ETF, such as  Universal Basic Education (UBE) and Millennium Development Goals (MDGs);
 The decay, rot and dilapidation of facilities issues in the tertiary education continued to be irritating as Funds are only thinly spread.

Establishment of the Tertiary Education Fund
The Tertiary Education Trust Fund was originally established as Education Trust Fund (ETF) by Act No 7 of 1993 as amended by Act No 40 of 1998 (now repealed and replaced with Tertiary Education Trust Fund  Act 2011). It is an intervention agency set up to provide supplementary support to all levels of public tertiary institutions with the main objective of using funding alongside project management for the rehabilitation, restoration and consolidation of Tertiary Education in Nigeria.
The main source of income available to the Fund is the two per cent education tax paid from the assessable profit of companies registered in Nigeria. The Federal Inland Revenue Services (FIRS) assesses collects the tax on behalf of the Fund.
The funds are disbursed for the general improvement of education in federal and state tertiary educations specifically for the provision or maintenance of:
 Essential physical infrastructure for teaching and learning;
 Institutional material and equipment;
 Research and publications;
 Academic staff training and development, and;
 Any other need which, in the opinion of the Board of Trustees, is critical and essential for the improvement and maintenance of standards in higher educational institutions.

The fund is managed by an eleven-member board with members drawn from the six geopolitical zones of the country as well as representative of the Federal Ministry of Education, Federal Ministry of Finance and the Federal Inland Revenue Services.
The board has the following responsibilities as stated in the act:
 Monitoring and ensuring collection of Tax by the Federal Inland Revenue Services and ensure transfer to the Fund;
 Manage and disburse the Tax;
 Liaise with appropriate ministries and bodies responsible for the collection or safekeeping of the Tax;
 Receive request and approve admit table projects after due consideration;
 Endure disbursement to various public tertiary education institutions in Nigeria;
 Monitor and evaluate the execution of projects;
 Invest funds in appropriate and safe securities;
 Update the Federal Government on its activities and progress through annual audited reports among the states of the Federation in case of regular intervention;
 Review progress and suggest improvement within the provisions of the Act;
 Do such other things that are necessary or incidental to the objective of the Fund under these Acts or as may be assigned by the Federal Government;
 Make any issue guidelines, from time to time, to all beneficiaries on disbursement of monies from the Fund on the use of monies received from the Fund;
 Generally to regulate the administration, application and disbursement of monies from the Fund under this Act.
The Board of Trustees shall administer, manage and disburse the tax imposed by this Act based on:
 Funding of all public tertiary educational institutions
 Equality among the six geo-political zones of the Federal in case of special intervention
 Equality among the states of the Federation in case of regular intervention

 The distribution shall be on the ratio of 2:1:1 as between Universities, Polytechnics and the College of Education.
 The BOT shall have the power to give due consideration to the peculiarities of each geo-political zones in the disbursement and management of the Tax imposed by this Act between the various levels of tertiary education.

References

External links
  Official website

2011 establishments in Nigeria